Amniculicolaceae is a family of fungi belonging to the order Pleosporales. First described in 2009 by Y. Zhang ter, C.L. Schoch, J. Fournier, Crous & K.D. Hyde, the type genus is Amniculicola.

Genera:
 Amniculicola Ying Zhang & K.D.Hyde
 Anguillospora Ingold, 1942
 Murispora Y.Zhang bis, J.Fourn. & K.D.Hyde
 Neomassariosphaeria Zhang, Fourn. & Hyde, 2009
 Pseudomassariosphaeria Phukhamsakda et al.

References

Pleosporales
Dothideomycetes families